Secondary Highway 560, commonly referred to as Highway 560, is a provincially maintained secondary highway in the northern section of the Canadian province of Ontario.

Highway560 was established, along with many of the secondary highways in Ontario, in 1956. It was extended westward  to Ontario Highway 144 in 1965. Aside from minor realignments along its isolated route, the route has remained unchanged since then.

Route description 
Highway560 is a remote route through some of the most isolated parts of Northeastern Ontario, spanning  between Highway144, where the road continues west as the Sultan Industrial Road, and Highway11 at Englehart. There are few gas stations and services located along the route, which is heavily travelled by logging trucks; warning signs are posted along the route as a reminder of this hazard.

The first  of the route is relatively straight, though like the rest of the highway, there are few signs of habitation along its journey through thick forests in the Canadian Shield; the hamlet of Ostrom is an exception to this. At Morin Village, the spur route Highway560A branches southwest to the village of Westree. Highway560 meanders around several lakes dotting the remainder of its journey to Englehart, serving the communities of Shining Tree and Gowganda along its twisting route. It also provides access to the West Montreal River Provincial Park at two locations west of Gowganda.

Within this vast uninhabited region, Highway560 is the closest public road to the highest point in Ontario, Ishpatina Ridge. At Elk Lake, the route provides access to Makobe - Grays River Provincial Park and then meets Highway 65, with which it shares a  concurrency. It continues another  through dense forests before suddenly emerging into the Ottawa-Bonnechere Graben. The remaining  of Highway560 travels through agricultural lands, as well as the community of Charlton (where it intersects Highway 573), before ending at Highway11 on the western edge of Englehart.

Like other provincial routes in Ontario, Highway560 is maintained by the Ministry of Transportation of Ontario. In 2016, traffic surveys conducted by the ministry showed that on average, 1,100vehicles used the highway daily along the  section between Highway11 and Highway573 (Bay Street) while 180vehicles did so each day along the  section between the latter and Highway65, the highest and lowest counts along the highway, respectively.

Highway 560A 
Highway560A is a secondary highway which serves as a short spur route from Highway560 southwest to the railway flag stop in the community of Westree. Based on the metrics provided in the section above, an average of 190vehicles traverse the highway each day.

History 
Highway560 was first designated in early 1956, like many of the secondary highways in Ontario.
It initially provided the only access into the interior of the Temagami region and Gogama. However, in the mid-1960s, work began on a new link between Sudbury and Timmins.  was absorbed into the route of Highway144 in April 1965.
Since then, the western terminus of Highway560 has been at Highway144. Although numerous minor realignments have been made to the route over the years, the general alignment of the highway has remained unchanged.

Major intersections 
The following table lists the major junctions along Highway 560.

{| class="wikitable" style="width:100%;"
|-
!scope="col"|Division
!scope="col"|Location
!scope="col"|km
!scope="col"|Destinations
!scope="col"|Notes
|-
|colspan="5" align="center"| continues west as the Sultan Industrial Road
|-
|rowspan="3"|Sudbury
|
|0.0
|
|
|-
|Morin Village
|31.0
|
|
|-
|
|41.7
|
|Opikimimk River Bridge
|-
|rowspan="5"|Timiskaming
|Gowganda
|100.9
|
|Gowganda Creek Bridge
|-
|rowspan="2"|Elk Lake
|143.1
|
|Beginning of Highway 65 concurrency
|-
|144.1
|
|End of Highway 65 concurrency
|-
|Charlton
|174.7
|
|
|-
|Englehart
|183.9
|
|Trans-Canada Highway

References

External links 
 Highway 560 at OntHighways.com

560
Roads in Sudbury District
Roads in Timiskaming District